The 8th West Virginia Infantry Regiment was an infantry regiment that served in the Union Army during the American Civil War.

Service
The 8th West Virginia Infantry Regiment was organized in Buffalo, West Virginia in November 1861 and attached to the District of the Kanawha, with men recruited from the central and southern counties of Braxton, Clay, Jackson, Kanawha, Putnam, Raleigh, Fayette, Boone, Logan and Wyoming. 

Originally known as the 8th Virginia Regiment of the Union Army, it became the 8th West Virginia when West Virginia was designated a state.

The unit fought at the Battle of Cross Keys under Lt. Colonel Lucien Loeser as a part of Cluseret's Brigade, alongside the 60th Ohio under overall command of Col. Gustave Paul Clusteret, a French officer who served with the Union Army.

On January 26, 1864, the 8th West Virginia was reorganized into a cavalry regiment, the 7th West Virginia Cavalry. It was mustered out on August 1, 1865.

References
The Civil War Archive

See also
West Virginia Units in the Civil War
West Virginia in the Civil War

Units and formations of the Union Army from West Virginia
1861 establishments in Virginia
Military units and formations established in 1861
Military units and formations disestablished in 1864